Law Chi-leung, also credited as Lo Chi-leung, is a Hong Kong film director and screenplay writer.

Filmography as director
 Viva Erotica (1996)
 Double Tap (2000)
 Inner Senses (2002)
 Koma (2004)
 Bug Me Not! (2005)
 Kidnap (2007)
 Curse of the Deserted (2010)
 The Bullet Vanishes (2012)
 The Vanished Murderer (2015)
 Come Back Home (2022)
 Wei Ji Hang Xian (2022)

External links
 
 hkcinemagic entry

Hong Kong film directors
Hong Kong screenwriters
Living people
Year of birth missing (living people)